Pisonia brunoniana is a species of flowering tree in the family Nyctaginaceae that is native to New Zealand, Norfolk Island, Lord Howe Island and Hawaii. The common names in New Zealand are parapara or birdcatcher tree.

Description
The wood is soft and the branches are brittle. The large leaves are opposite or ternate, glabrous, and glossy, entire (simple with smooth margins), and obtuse to rounded at apex. The inflorescence is paniculate, many-flowered, and the flowers are unisexual.

In the Seychelles, the sticky seeds of a related species, Pisonia grandis, regularly causes seabird deaths, and research suggests that the seeds evolved to be transferred on the plumage of seabirds to distant islands, enabling the long-distance dispersal of the species. The situation may be similar with P. brunoniana.

Distribution in New Zealand

In New Zealand, Pisonia brunoniana grows in coastal forest on Raoul Island in the Kermadec group, on the Three Kings Islands, and in the North Island in scattered locations from Whangape Harbour to Mangawhai. Historically, it grew near Auckland, on the Coromandel Peninsula and at East Cape. It is now mainly found on offshore islands, especially rodent-free islands, where it often forms an important understorey component of mixed-broadleaf forest.

The plant is almost extinct in the North Island, partly because the large leaves of P. brunoniana are eagerly eaten by browsing animals such as possums, goats and feral cattle.

The plant is reasonably common in cultivation as a decorative tree in New Zealand, especially in the northern North Island. Two variegated cultivars are sold as P. brunoniana in New Zealand nurseries, although one of these, which has leaves extensively marbled with white, may in fact be P. umbellifera, a similar species which occurs throughout the tropical Indo-Pacific.

In Hawaii

In Hawaii, where it is known as pāpala kēpau, P. brunoniana is most common in dry to mesic habitats. Although abundant in certain locations, such as Kīpuka Puaulu, it has a relatively restricted distribution compared to the related species P. sandwicensis and P. umbellifera. The sticky fruits were employed by the Hawaiian kia manu (bird catchers) to trap birds in order to collect feathers for capes and other objects.

Notes

References
 
 
 Metcalf, Laurie, 2002. A Photographic Guide to Trees of New Zealand. Auckland: New Holland.
 Salmon, J.T., 1986. The Native Trees of New Zealand. Wellington: Heinneman Reed.
 Flora of Australia Online Pisonia brunoniana. Retrieved 3 May 2007.
 Hawaiian Ethnobotany Online Database, Bishop Museum. URL: Papala kepau. Retrieved 3 May 2007.
 New Zealand Plant Conservation Network, URL: Pisonia brunoniana. Retrieved 3 October 2010.
 Plants of Hawaii, URL:Papala kepau. Retrieved 3 May 2007.

brunoniana
Trees of New Zealand
Flora of Lord Howe Island
Flora of Norfolk Island
Trees of Hawaii
Trees of Australia
Caryophyllales of Australia
Flora without expected TNC conservation status